The Uttar Pradesh Wizards (abbreviated as UPW) are a field hockey team based in Lucknow, Uttar Pradesh that plays in the Hockey India League. It is owned by Sahara India Pariwar. Former Dutch coach Roelant Oltmans serves as coach for the team and former Indian captain Dhanraj Pillay acts as the technical director of the team.

Franchisee Details

Ownership
The team is owned by Sahara Adventure Sports Limited, a group company of Sahara India, bought the franchise on 23 July 2012. Sahara India is also the chief sponsor of Hockey India, the top-federation for hockey in India. This was the first franchise of Hockey India League to be bought.
In December 2014, Suresh Raina becomes the co-owner of Uttar Pradesh Wizards.

2017 squad

Statistics

Hat-tricks

Fixtures and Results

2013

 Goals For: 25 (1.79 per match)
 Goals Against: 29 (2.07 per match)
 Most Goals: 9 (Overall: 3rd)
 V. R. Raghunath

2014

2015

 Goals For: 13 (2.17 per match)
 Goals Against: 9 (1.50 per match)
 Most Goals: V. R. Raghunath (4)

Sponsors & Kit Manufacturers

References

See also
 Hockey India League

 
Hockey India League teams
Field hockey in Uttar Pradesh
2012 establishments in Uttar Pradesh
Sport in Lucknow
Sahara India Pariwar
Indian field hockey clubs